Zhob Airport  is a small domestic airport located in Zhob, Balochistan, Pakistan. It is a smaller airport and caters mainly to the population of Zhob and surrounding townships.

See also 
 List of airports in Pakistan

References

External links 

Airports in Balochistan, Pakistan
Zhob District